Lindsey Marie Williams is an American politician. She is a Democratic member of the Pennsylvania State Senate, representing the 38th district.

Education

Williams earned a BA in political science from Dickinson College and a JD from Duquesne University School of Law.

Career 
Williams worked as director of advocacy for the National Whistleblower Center, but was laid off in 2012 after attempting to unionize the small workforce. She was offered a severance package but rejected it because of a confidentiality clause that would have prevented her from discussing her experiences. She appealed to the National Labor Relations Board, and eventually settled the case with her former employer.

In 2014, Williams became communications director for the Pittsburgh Federation of Teachers. She also previously worked for the International Brotherhood of Teamsters.

In 2018, Williams ran against Republican nominee Jeremy Shaffer in the general election, after Shaffer had defeated incumbent Randy Vulakovich in the Republican primary. The race was heavily watched, and Williams received an endorsement from former U.S. President Barack Obama. Both campaigns raised substantial amounts of funding—Williams raised over $700,000 and Shaffer raised over $1 million, including contributing $400,000 of his own money by the start of October and another $100,000 by the end of the month. Williams also campaigned and shared resources with other local female candidates, including Sara Innamorato. She narrowly defeated Shaffer (50.1% to 49.7%) in the election.

Weeks before the election, Republicans in the state claimed Williams did not meet the constitutional residency requirement and attempted to remove her name from the ballot. They contended that since she voted in Maryland in the 2014 general election, she had not been a resident of Pennsylvania for at least four years as required by the state constitution. However, the effort was rejected by a court. After she won the election, state Republicans renewed their opposition and challenged her ability to be seated in the legislature. After months of controversy, the Republican leadership in the Senate decided against preventing her inauguration based on the documents produced by Williams. She took the oath of office and was sworn in with other newly elected members on January 1, 2019.

References

External links
Official page at the Pennsylvania General Assembly
Campaign site
 

Living people
Democratic Party Pennsylvania state senators
21st-century American politicians
1983 births